Armik Dashchi, professionally known as Armik, is an Iranian-Armenian American New Flamenco guitarist, producer and composer.  Several of Armik's albums have reached Billboards Top New Age Albums chart. A child prodigy, born in Iran of Armenian descent, at seven years old he pawned his watch for a classical guitar, which he hid and practiced on in the basement. By the age of nine, Armik had completed formal music lessons as well as a rigid instructional regimen. At the age of 12, he was a professional recording artist. He launched his solo career in 1994.

Discography

Studio albums
 1994 - Rain Dancer 
 1995 - Gypsy Flame (AUS: Gold)
 1996 - Rubia 
 1997 - Malaga 
 1999 - Isla del Sol 
 2001 - Rosas del Amor 
 2002 - Lost In Paradise
 2003 - Amor de Guitarra 
 2004 - Romantic Dreams
 2004 - Piano Nights
 2004 - Treasures
 2005 - Cafe Romantico
 2005 - Mar de Sueños 
 2006 - Mi Pasión 
 2006 - Christmas Wishes
 2007 - Guitarrista 
 2007 - A Day In Brazil
 2008 - Barcelona
 2009 - Serenata 
 2010 - Besos 
 2012 - Casa De Amor 
 2012 - Reflections 
 2013 - Alegra 
2013 - Flames of Love
 2014 - Romantic Spanish Guitar, Volume 1 
 2014 - Mystify
 2015 - Romantic Spanish Guitar, Volume 2 
 2015 - La Vida
 2016 - Romantic Spanish Guitar, Volume 3
 2017 - Enamor
 2018 - Pacifica
 2019 - Alchemy
 2020 - Esta Guitarra (Five Songs)
2021 - Spanish Lover (EP: Five Songs) 
2022 - Illuminate (EP: Five Songs)

Compilations
 2003 - The Best of Armik 
 2006 - Desires: The Romantic Collection 
 2008 - Fuego Gitana: The Nuevo Flamenco Collection 
 2014 - Greatest Hits
 2016 - Solo Guitar Collection

Other Compilation Appearances
 1997 - Gypsy Passion: New Flamenco (Narada)
 1998 - Gypsy Soul: New Flamenco (Narada)
 1999 - Obsession: New Flamenco Romance (Narada)
 2000 - Guitar Greats: The Best of New Flamenco - Volume I (Baja/TSR Records)
 2002 - Guitar Greats: The Best of New Flamenco - Volume II (Baja/TSR Records)
 2005 - Bolero Gypsies: New Flamenco - Volume I (Bolero Records)
 2005 - Music Fantasy: Volume I (Bolero Records)
 2006 - Bolero Gypsies: New Flamenco - Volume II (Bolero Records)
 2009 - Gypsy Spice: Best of New Flamenco (Baja/TSR Records)
 2013 - Guitar Greats: The Best of New Flamenco - Volume III (Baja/TSR Records)

References

External links
 Armik | Official Website

Year of birth missing (living people)
Living people
Flamenco guitarists
New-age musicians
Iranian guitarists
People from Tehran
Iranian people of Armenian descent
Musicians of Iranian descent
Iranian music arrangers